Speed limits in the United States vary depending on jurisdiction. States may also set separate speed limits for trucks and night travel along with minimum speed limits.

Alabama
In Alabama, it is illegal to drive at a speed that is not "reasonable and prudent" for the current conditions and hazards. Drivers must also not drive so slowly that they impede the flow of traffic. If the speed limit is not otherwise posted, it is:
 in urban areas
 on unpaved roads
 on rural paved county roads
 on other two-lane roads
 on four-lane roads
 on Interstate Highways
Trucks carrying hazardous materials are not to exceed .

Alaska
In Alaska, many of the major highways carry a  speed limit, including:
A majority of the Parks Highway between Fairbanks and Willow (excepting slower zones through Nenana, Denali Park, Cantwell, and Healy)
Most of the Richardson Highway between Valdez and North Pole
The Seward Highway in Anchorage between 36th Avenue and Rabbit Creek Road, and other non-freeway parts of the Seward Highway south of Bird Point
Most of the Alaska Highway between the Canadian border and Delta Junction
The Minnesota Drive Expressway features a  speed limit, as does the Richardson Highway between Fairbanks and North Pole.

Since the mid-1990s, Alaska's major highways have gradually been upgraded from 55 mph to 60 or 65 mph. However, several continue to carry the default  speed limit, including:
 The Sterling Highway
 The Tok Cut-Off
 The Haines Highway
 Portions of the Parks Highway and Seward Highway designated "safety zones"
 Portions of the Elliott Highway and Steese Highway close to Fairbanks

The Dalton Highway and parts of the Elliot Highway are 50 mph.

Default speed limits in Alaska are:
 in alleys
 in a business district
 in a residential district
 on other roads

American Samoa

The 30 miles per hour speed limit is the lowest maximum speed limit of any state or permanently inhabited territory. Although 30 mph is the maximum speed limit, in most areas  is the maximum speed limit.

Arizona
Exceeding these limits only in the best of driving conditions is considered prima facie evidence of speeding. Altered speed limits are not prima facie.

Some portions of Interstate 15 have the same regulations due to sharp curves. Within "urbanized areas",  speed limit citations are given for "waste of a finite resource". This exception only applies within a  threshold. As long as the speed does not exceed , the infraction is not recorded as a traffic violation for the purposes of a point system.

A non-numeric minimum speed limit is incorporated with the basic speed rule in Arizona, which also prohibits speeds higher than would be "reasonable and prudent".

Night speed limit signs are posted on some roads within Tucson city limits that do not have street lights. Examples: Fort Lowell Road from Oracle Road to Country Club Road, 22nd Street from Interstate 10 to Cherry Avenue.

Arkansas
Outside of the municipal limits, two-lane state and federal highways have a speed limit of  unless otherwise posted, and 2 lane county roads have a speed limit of  unless otherwise posted. Furthermore, AHTD has established freeway default speed limits. School zone speed limits apply only when children are present, or when a lighted beacon is on if one is provided and such speed limits are set at  unless otherwise posted.

This bill became law on April 7, 2017, however no highways were immediately given a 75 mph limit.

The new law strikes the requirement for the Highway Commission to first conduct a traffic study before raising the limit; instead a study will be necessary for the Highway Commission to justify lowering the speed limit.

As of August 5, 2020, new signs are up indicating the speed limit increase from 70 to 75 mph (70 mph for trucks) on I-40 west of Little Rock to the Oklahoma border.

California

Basic speed law
California's "Basic Speed Law", part of the California Vehicle Code, defines the maximum speed at which a car may travel as a "reasonable and prudent" speed, given road conditions. The reasonable speed may be lower than the posted speed limit in conditions such as fog, heavy rain, ice, snow, gravel, sharp corners, blinding glare, darkness, crossing traffic, or when there is an obstructed view of orthogonal traffic—such as by road curvature, parked cars, vegetation, or snow banks—thus limiting the Assured Clear Distance Ahead (ACDA). Basic speed laws are statutized reinforcements of the centuries-old common law negligence doctrine as specifically applied to vehicular speed. California Vehicle Code section 22350 is typical; it states that "No person shall drive a vehicle upon a highway at a speed greater than is reasonable ... and in no event at a speed which endangers the safety of persons or property".

Speed limits in California are mandated by statute to be set: (1) at or below the 85th percentile operating speed;
as determined by a traffic and engineering survey—this is the speed that no more than 15% of traffic exceeds; or (2) the prima facie limits mandated when certain criteria are met as described in the vehicle code. These criteria include school zone, alleyway, and residential area.

If the 85th percentile operating speed as measured by a Traffic and Engineering Survey exceeds the design speed, compulsory legal protection is given to that speed—even if it is unsafe with regard to certain technical aspects such as sight distance. This speed creep may continue until the 85th percentile operating speed is comparable to speed psychologically perceived as uncomfortably hazardous.

The theory behind California's 85th percentile statute is that, as a policy, most of the electorate should be seen as lawful, and limits must be practical to enforce. However, there are some circumstances where motorists do not tend to process all the risks involved, and as a mass choose a poor 85th percentile speed. This rule in substance is a process for voting the speed limit by driving; and in contrast to delegating the speed limit to an engineering expert.

The numerical limit set by Caltrans engineers for speed limit signs, generally found on all non-controlled-access routes, is considered a presumptive maximum "reasonable and prudent" speed.

When the National Maximum Speed Law was enacted, California was forced to create a new legal signage category, "Maximum Speed", to indicate to drivers that the Basic Speed Law did not apply for speeds over the federally mandated speed cap; rather, it would be a violation to exceed the fixed maximum speed indicated on the sign, regardless of whether the driver's speed could be considered "reasonable and prudent".

A driver can receive a traffic citation for violating the Basic Speed Law even if their speed is below the "maximum speed limit" if road, weather, or traffic conditions make that speed unsafe. However, because the Basic Speed Law establishes prima facie limits, not absolute ones, they can also defend against a citation for speeding "by competent evidence that the speed in excess of said limits did not constitute a violation of the basic speed law at the time, place and under the conditions then existing", per section 22351(b) of the California Vehicle Code. Thus, a driver who operates over the speed limit, but less than the usual  maximum speed ( for two-lane undivided highways, isn't necessarily violating California's speed laws where the driver's speed was otherwise safe under the circumstances.

Speed limits
Rural freeways, such as parts of I-5, I-8, I-10, I-15, I-40, I-205, I-215, I-505, I-580, US 101 and SR 99, have  speed limits. The highest speed limit on I-80 is  because it passes almost exclusively through urban and mountainous areas. However, the speed limit on the San Francisco–Oakland Bay Bridge and in San Francisco is only . This includes the entire length of the Pasadena Freeway between Pasadena and downtown Los Angeles, and portions of the Hollywood, Santa Ana, Santa Monica, and Harbor Freeways. Some two-lane roads can be  for some locations in California. However, Caltrans or a local agency can post a speed of up to  after an engineering study.

There is a  speed limit for trucks with at least 3 axles and all vehicles while towing.

Colorado

There are also basic prima facie speed limits in Colorado.
  on narrow, winding mountain roads
  in any business district
  in any residential district
  on open mountain highways

Night speed limits
On certain stretches of rural highways, notably US 160 between Durango and Pagosa Springs and US 550 between Durango and Silverton, nighttime speed limits are in effect during peak migratory periods for area wildlife. Speeding fines are doubled when nighttime speed limits are in effect.

Connecticut
Connecticut was among the last states to raise its maximum speed limit from  originally established by the National Maximum Speed Law in 1974.

Speed limits for all roads within Connecticut—including local streets—are established by the State Traffic Commission, an agency composed of members of the Department of Motor Vehicles (CTDMV), the Department of Emergency Services and Public Protection (DESPP), and the Department of Transportation (CONNDOT).

The State Traffic Commission typically sets speed limits following engineering studies performed by CONNDOT. Data used in setting speed limits includes traffic volume vs. roadway capacity, design speed, road geometry, the spacing of intersections and/or interchanges, the number of driveways and curb cuts, and accident rates.

Municipalities are normally required to seek approval from the State Traffic Commission for changes to the posted speed limits on locally owned streets after appropriate engineering studies are performed.

Speeding fines are doubled in school zones when children are present, and construction areas when workers are present.

This action follows a DOT study showing the 85th percentile speed of free flowing traffic on this segment averaged .

Delaware
In Delaware, four roads carry a  speed limit: Interstate 95 from the Maryland line to the southern junction with I-495, Interstate 495, US 301, and Delaware Route 1 between the Puncheon Run Connector in Dover and US 13 in Tybouts Corner. Prior to the National Maximum Speed Law that went into effect nationwide, I-95 used to have a  speed limit except around Wilmington.

Four lane highways such as US 13, US 113, portions of US 40 near Bear and Glasgow, and the at-grade portions of DE 1 are normally .

School zones have  speed limits.

Interstate 495, which forms a bypass around Wilmington, features variable speed limit signs for environmental purposes. The limit is also lowered during construction, weather conditions, and when accidents occur.

Frequent advertising campaigns on in-state radio stations remind residents of this (as of January 2013).

District of Columbia

There are no rural roads in the District of Columbia.

Florida

It can also be found on a portion of US 301 known as the Starke Bypass.  is typical on rural 4-lane highways (such as US 19 north of St. Petersburg, among other US Highways) as well as most other urban freeways and tollways. This is typically done on very rural state roads (such as SR 471) and US Highways (such as US 98 along most of the state's panhandle).

Statutory speed limits in Florida are as follows:
  within municipal districts
  for all other roadways

Florida typically does not post night speed limits, but there are a few exceptions. For the most part, these night time reduced speeds are located in wildlife preserves for such endangered species as the Florida panther and the key deer. Most of the Tamiami Trail through the Big Cypress National Preserve has a  night speed limit. On some stretches of road where the speed limit is reduced at night, the daytime speed limit sign is non-reflective, such that at night, only the night limit is visible.

At one time, these minimum speeds required signage, but these limits have since been codified in state law; signs indicating these minimum speeds still exist, but now simply serve as a reminder. Urban freeways with speed limits of 50 mph typically do not have minimum speed limits, such as on I-375 in St. Petersburg.

Florida also does not impose lower truck speed limits. As such, all traffic is permitted to travel at the same speed.

School zones in Florida usually have  limits. Most have flashing yellow lights activated during the times they are in effect as well as accompanying signs that post the times these reduced speed limits are effective. All are strictly enforced and carry an increased penalty for violations.

Georgia

However, a new law has permitted urban interstates to now be posted as high as 70 mph, and some have already reflected this change, such as I-95 through Brunswick, I-85 in Gwinnett County, I-75 in Macon, Valdosta, and Tifton, and I-185 in Columbus . Urban interstates in the Peach State are at 65 mph. I-95 through suburban Savannah between exits 102 and 99, I-16, from the interchange with I-75 in central Macon eastbound past Exit 2, and east of exit 157, with the interchange for I-95, is also at 65 mph. Most non-interstate freeways such as the Athens perimeter highway, are posted at 55 mph.

However, in recent years, US 1 between Augusta and Wrens raised the speed limit to 65 mph. Other rural four-lane highways with a 65 mph include portions of SR 540 west of Sandersville, US 441 between Milledgeville and north of Dublin, US 25 between Augusta and Statesboro, SR 88 between Sandersville, and Wrens, SR 16 between Griffin and I-75, much of US 341 between Brunswick and I-75, and much of US 82 in South Georgia.

County maintained roads will rarely have speed limits above  in middle & south Georgia,  in north Georgia.

All roadways maintained by GDOT that are subject to speed limit reductions are given advanced notice with signage that says "SPEED ZONE AHEAD". Furthermore, GDOT has a policy of doing  increments but never higher than 10 mph.

Georgia is one of few states with anti-speed trap laws passed in the late 1990s. In 2009, Georgia introduced the "Super Speeder" law, which adds an additional speeding fine (above base fine and court costs) of $200 for motorists convicted of traveling  or more over the posted speed limit.

Guam

On most major roads,  is the maximum speed limit.

Hawaii
Hawaii was the last state to raise its maximum speed limit after the National Maximum Speed Law was repealed in 1995, and still has the lowest maximum speed limit of any state.

Idaho

Generally single-lane rural roads have  limits, and multi-lane rural roads have  limits.

Idaho senator Bart Davis brought SB 1284a to the House of Representatives for discussion in early 2014. Days before the law was to go into effect, however, it was put on hold in order to allow a more thorough review of the effects of a raised speed limit. A vote on July 14, 2014, approved the  increase on limited sections of interstates in the southern portions of Idaho. Studies began for other areas later of that summer.
As of July 24, 2014, the new  signs are up on rural Idaho Interstates.

Illinois
Interstate Highways in Illinois are usually posted with both minimum and maximum speed limits, except in some urban areas, particularly Chicago. The standard speed limit is 70 mph for rural freeways, a 45 mph minimum speed limit, 65 mph for other 4 lane divided highways, and 55 mph for all other highways. Urban freeway/interstate speed limits can range from as low as 45 mph in downtown Chicago, where all the major interstates merge, to as high as 70 mph in the outer portions of the Chicago and East St. Louis metro areas, and in some smaller cities. All the expressways leading directly out of downtown Chicago, which are The Dan Ryan Expressway, The Stevenson Expressway, The Eisenhower Expressway, and The Kennedy Expressway, have a 55 mph speed limit. Other expressways that branch off of the main ones leaving downtown, such as The Edens Expressway and The Bishop Ford Expressway, also carry a 55 mph limit. The Chicago Skyway does carry a 55 mph limit, but the tolled portion is signed at 45 mph. Lake Shore Drive carries a 40 mph speed limit from its northern terminus to E 31st Street, and from there to the end of the expressway, the speed limit is 45 mph. Some interstates in small cities (e.g. I-55/74 through Bloomington-Normal, I-39/90 through the Rockford area, I-57 through Champaign-Urbana) do not have reduced speed limits, and stretches of I-90 and I-355 in the Chicago suburbs are also signed at 70 mph. Most freeways and interstates in Cook, DuPage, and Lake Counties, and some interstates and freeways in Will County maintain a 55-60 mph speed limit. Due to the high population density, the only freeways in Cook County that exceed a speed limit of 60 mph are I-57 at the southern edge of the county, part of I-80 between Central Ave and Harlem Ave, I-90 west of Mt. Prospect Rd., and the southern segment of I-355, which passes through Cook County briefly before crossing into Will County to both the north and south. As of January 2010, a reduced speed limit posted in a construction zone must be obeyed 24 hours a day, regardless of whether workers are present.

As of March 27, 2018, the speed limit on I-90 from Randall Rd. in Elgin to Mt. Prospect Rd. in Des Plaines has been increased to 70 mph, and from Mt. Prospect Rd. to the beginning of the Kennedy Expressway, it has been increased to 60 mph. I-290 is posted at 60 mph for a few miles near Schaumburg, from IL-72 down to shortly before the I-355 exit.

Indiana

On Interstate 469 in Fort Wayne (Indiana's 2nd largest city) the speed limit is still set at 70 mph.

On February 6, 2012, the Indiana Toll Road was raised from the Illinois state line to mile marker 20 to  after a major highway reconstruction project.

Iowa
In Iowa, the majority of highways have a  speed limit. Rural Interstate Highways carry a  limit and a  minimum. The Interstate 74 Bridge from Bettendorf to Moline, Illinois, for instance, has a  limit because the bridge is narrow and has no shoulders. Four-lane roads may have a  limit. If the road is built to freeway standards, such as US 20 between I-35 and Dubuque, it may have a minimum speed limit, but otherwise four-lane roads carry no minimum limit so slow-moving farm vehicles may use the roadway.

Kansas
On the other hand, statistically significant increases in crash, fatal crash and fatality rates were observed on the 2-lane rural highway network.". The Kansas Department of Transportation announced on June 21, 2011, that 807 miles of roadway, comprising the rural areas of I-70, I-35, I-135, the Kansas Turnpike and the freeway-improved sections of US-69 and US-81, will be raised to 75 mph. Other four-lane, non-limited access divided highways have a speed limit of 70 mph, with 65 mph on two-lane undivided roads, and 55 mph on township roads. Prior to the National Maximum Speed Limit, the speed limit on the Kansas Turnpike used to be , but was reduced to 75 mph on August 17, 1970. The minimum speed limit on Kansas Interstates is 40 mph.

Kentucky
Kentucky generally has a 70 mph speed limit on rural freeways as of 2007. The speed limit is reduced to 55 on multi-lane highways in some urban areas (I-71/75 south of Cincinnati, I-64, I-65, I-71 and I-264 in Louisville, and KY 4 in Lexington. There are two 50 mph areas in Louisville. One approaching the Sherman Minton Bridge crossing the Ohio River into Indiana on I-64, and one approaching the Kennedy Bridge on I-65 towards Indiana. The Transportation Cabinet is now authorized to raise any multilane, divided rural highway up to 65 MPH based on speed and design studies. Anyone may request an increase by contacting their local Transportation Cabinet office and specifying the roadway to be raised. Two-lane, undivided highways are limited to 55 mph. Points are not assessed for speeds less than 10 mph over the speed limit only on limited access highways, or for tickets received by Kentucky licensed drivers out of state.

Louisiana
Louisiana's highest speed limit is 75 mph, found on 154 miles of Interstate 49 in Saint Landry, Avoyelles, Evangeline, Rapides, Natchitoches, DeSoto and Caddo parishes. The Caddo Parish 75 zone is split into two portions, from the DeSoto-Caddo Parish line to Louisiana Highway 526, and from Louisiana Highway 1 to the Arkansas state line. The 75 zone was established by the Louisiana Department of Transportation and Development in 2011 after a 2010 bill authorized the DOTD to implement 75 zones where proven to be safe.

70 mph is posted on Interstates 10, 12, 20, 49, 55, 59, 220, and 310.

A speed limit of 60 mph is posted on I-10 in Lake Charles, Baton Rouge, and from LaPlace to New Orleans, I-12 in Baton Rouge, I-20 in Shreveport and Monroe, I-49 in Alexandria and Shreveport, I-220 in Shreveport, US 71 and US 167 in Kingsville, LA 3132, and I-110, I-210, I-510, I-610, and I-910 (note: part of I-10 in Baton Rouge was raised to 70 mph, and part of I-12 in Baton Rouge was also raised to 65 mph).

Most two-lane highways in Louisiana have a maximum speed limit of 55 mph.

In August 2003, Governor Mike Foster announced speed and lane restrictions on trucks on the  stretch of I-10 known as the Atchafalaya Swamp Freeway. The restrictions lower the truck speed limit to 55 mph and restrict them to the right lane for the entire length of the elevated freeway.

Other laws
There are exceptions to the basic highway and speed laws

Divided highways in rural areas have a 65 mph speed limits. Louisiana law R.S. 32:61(B) & 32:62(A) states;65 mph on other multi-lane divided highways which have partial or no control of access.

Louisiana operates under the reasonable and prudent basic law;No person shall drive a vehicle at a speed greater than is reasonable and prudent under the conditions and potential hazards then existing, having due regard for the traffic on, and the surface and width of, the highway, and the condition of the weather. R.S. 32:64(A)

A person, who is operating a motor vehicle on a multilane highway at less than the normal speed of traffic, shall drive in the right-hand lane then available for traffic. R.S. 32:71(B)(1)

Maine
Maine carries the highest speed limit on the East Coast, with Interstate 95 carrying a  limit between Old Town and Houlton. Sections of I-95 south of Old Town as well as half of I-295 carry  limits, except for brief  zones in more populated areas.

Default speed limits in Maine are:
 in a school zone within 30 minutes of the beginning or end of the school day or whenever/wherever children are present
 near an intersection "when the operator's view is obstructed", unless right-of-way is given via signage
 in business or residential districts, or other built-up areas
 on county roads
 on other roads

In Maine, school buses may not exceed  on roads with higher speed limits while transporting students.

Fines for speeding are at least $50 by law.

Maryland
The speed limit on Maryland's Interstate Highways are posted by default at 65 mph although 70 mph limits can be posted after a traffic and engineering study. Effective October 1, 2015, the speed limit on I-68 is 70 mph except for a seven-mile section around Cumberland. Effective April 4, 2016, the speed limit on I-70 has been increased to 70 mph from the Pennsylvania state line to MD 180 in Frederick County and from MD 144 in Frederick County to US 29 in Howard County. Maryland's urban freeways normally have speed limits of 55 mph (like I-495) or 60 mph, although some stretches are signed for 65 mph travel such as portions of I-95 and I-97 in and around the Baltimore suburbs, I-70 around Frederick, and I-81 around Hagerstown. I-70 around Hagerstown is posted at 70 mph. More restrictive limits are found on I-83 south of North Avenue when approaching downtown Baltimore and on I-68 through Cumberland, both sections being marked at 40 mph.

Four lane non-interstates and non-freeways are posted at 55 mph. This includes the expressway grade roadways like US 50 and US 301 east of the Bay Bridge, US 15 north of Frederick to the Pennsylvania state line, MD 404 around Denton and US 29 between I-495 and I-70. US 340 from Brunswick to I-70 in Frederick however is posted as 65 mph.

Normally, speed limit drops are in 5 mph to 10 mph increments. However, one speed zone drops from 55 to 25 mph along US 301 southbound at the Nice Bridge for the toll plaza.

Two lane roads are generally posted at 50 mph but there are a handful of routes posted at 55 mph. It is more common to see 55 mph on the Eastern Shore and in Frederick and Carroll counties than the Baltimore-Washington corridor and Western Maryland. Two lane routes that have a speed limit of 55 mph enforce mandatory headlight use.

Urban and downtown speed limits are generally posted at 30 mph.

Massachusetts
As prescribed by Massachusetts law, default speed limits are the following:

 in the area of a vehicle (for example, an ice cream truck) that is selling merchandise and is displaying flashing amber lights
 in a school zone when children are present
 on a road in a "thickly settled" or business district for at least 
 on a road outside of a "thickly settled" or business district for at least 
 on a divided highway outside of a "thickly settled" or business district for at least 

This can be subjective since a large part of eastern Massachusetts is built up with many different jurisdictions and different speed limits assigned.

Michigan
Michigan uses a formula based on the number of driveways and streets, or on the 85th percentile of free-flowing traffic, and if none those methods are used a  default applies. In rural areas, speed limits are as follows:

Freeways in Michigan are usually signed with both minimum and maximum speeds. The Michigan Department of Transportation and the Michigan State Police may raise the speed limit to  after it is deemed safe to do so. MDOT and the MSP announced on April 26, 2017, that the speed limit was increased to 75 mph on several Michigan freeways, including I-75 from Bay City to Sault Ste. Marie (excluding the Mackinac Bridge), I-69 from Business Loop 69 in Clinton County to I-94 in St. Clair County (excluding the section in and around Flint, which remains at ), US 127 from I-69 in Clinton County to I-75 in Crawford County (excluding the 15-mile stretch between St. Johns and Ithaca, which is not freeway standard), and US 131 from M-57 in Kent County to the end of the freeway north of Manton. These increases commenced on May 1, 2017, and were completed by May 15, 2017. Speed limits in freeway work zones are statutorily limited to  24 hours per day.

Michigan's speed limits on urban Interstates are typically higher than its adjacent states. Other freeways in Detroit such as I-94 and I-96 also have  speed limits in and around the city's downtown area, but rise to  relatively soon after leaving the downtown area.

However, Michigan permits speed limits of up to  after a safety study concludes the higher limit is safe to implement. Until 2016, this provision only applied to four-lane divided non-limited access highways. In 2017 speed limits began increasing to 65 mph on several select two-lane roads in both the Lower and Upper Peninsulas of Michigan, including US 2 from St. Ignace to Rapid River and M-28 from I-75 to Munising.

Midway Atoll

Minnesota
As of August 2019 cities have been allowed to set speed limits on city-owned streets without the Minnesota Department of Transportation (MnDOT) conducting a speed study, though the law does require the city to conduct its own, independent engineering review.

A  speed limit is only allowed on Minnesota's Interstates outside of urban areas. Examples include I-94, I-35W and I-35E in and around Minneapolis, Moorhead and Saint Paul.

Rural two lane state and US Highways in Minnesota have default speed limits of  although many  speed limits are in place after a traffic and engineering study from 2014 to 2019.

Mississippi
A speed limit of 70 mph is only allowed on Mississippi's rural freeways; only the Interstates (except I-110), US 78, Mississippi Highway 304 (MS 304), and a portion of US 82 have speed limits of 70 mph, with these lengths making up approximately 86% of the state's freeway mileage.

A speed limit of 65 mph is typically used on the state's four-lane divided highways, which include parts of the following roadways:
 U.S. Route 45 / U.S. Route 45 Alternate
 U.S. Route 49 / U.S. Route 49W
 U.S. Route 61
 U.S. Route 72
 U.S. Route 82
 U.S. Route 84
 U.S. Route 90
 U.S. Route 98
 U.S. Route 278
 MS 15
 MS 19
 MS 25
 MS 39
 MS 57
 MS 63
 MS 67
 MS 302
 MS 605
 MS 607

A speed limit of 60 mph is typically used in urban areas where a higher speed limit might be used, but traffic or geometric conditions constitute a lower speed limit, including the following areas:
 Interstate 20 in Vicksburg, from Jackson to Pearl, and Meridian
 Interstate 55 from Jackson to Ridgeland
 Interstate 59 in Laurel and Meridian
 U.S. Route 61 in Tunica Resorts
 U.S. Route 78 in New Albany
 U.S. Route 82 in Columbus

Mississippi has a minimum speed of 30 mph on four-lane U.S. Highways when no hazard exists. Strangely, there is no law for the minimum speed of the state's growing number of four-lane state highways. The minimum is 40 mph on Interstate Highways and on four-lane U.S. Highways that have a 70 mph speed limit. In 2004, Mississippi posted minimum speed limits (40 mph) on all rural Interstates, but this minimum speed limit was already state law before then.

Missouri
Statutory speed limits in Missouri are as follows:
 Interstate highways and freeways in rural areas: 70 mph
 Expressways in rural areas: 65 mph (notable exceptions being the US 54 & US 63 Expressways to the north of Jefferson City, which are at-grade expressways with a 70 mph speed limit)
 Interstates, freeways, and expressways in urban areas: 60 mph
 Other numbered state-maintained rural highways: 60 mph
 State gravel roads: 25 mph

Freeways are defined as: "a limited access divided highway of at least ten miles in length with four or more lanes which is not part of the federal interstate system of highways which does not have any crossovers or accesses from streets, roads or other highways at the same grade level as such divided highway within such ten miles of divided highway."

Expressways are defined as: "a divided highway of at least ten miles in length with four or more lanes which is not part of the federal interstate system of highways which has crossovers or accesses from streets, roads or other highways at the same grade level as such divided highway."

Urban Areas are defined as: "an area of fifty thousand population at a density at or greater than one thousand persons per square mile".

The highways and transportation commission may raise or lower the speed limit on these highways, but no speed limit may be set above 70 mph on a numbered highway and 60 mph on a lettered highway.

Interstate highways have minimum speed limits of 40 mph.

Variable speed limits
Missouri concluded a two-year experiment with variable speed limits along I-270 around St. Louis. Digital signs had been erected along the freeway as well as additional signs alerting drivers about the use of variable speed limits. The limits will vary between 40 and 60 miles per hour, depending on traffic conditions, and could change by up to 5 mph every 5 minutes. These speed limits, as of January 2012, are now posted as "Advisory Speed Limits".

During the closure and major rebuild of I-64 in St. Louis, an additional lane was added to I-44 and I-70, and the speed limit was thus reduced to 55 mph on those roads within the St. Louis County and City. The I-64 construction has been completed, and the extra lanes were removed in 2010. In October 2010, the speed limit was restored to 60 mph on both I-44 and I-70.

Exceptions to the statutory limits
Most two-lane roads with shoulders have a 60 mph speed limit in Missouri. Two-lane roads without shoulders are usually, but not always, limited to 55 mph. Some improved two-lane highways have a 65 mph speed limit in rural areas, such as:
 US-54 from El Dorado Springs west to the Kansas state line; from the MO-73 intersection southwest of Macks Creek to near Camdenton; and also along the three-mile-long Mexico bypass.
 US-63 from Vienna south to Thayer, near the Arkansas state line. Some of this route has three lanes, with the passing lane alternating between northbound and southbound traffic.
 MO-5 between Camdenton and Lebanon. This road has three lanes, with the passing lane alternating between northbound and southbound traffic.
 MO-43 from US-54 south to Seneca
 MO-96 from I-44 west to Carthage

Most rural expressways have a 65 mph speed limit, however some have an upgraded speed limit of 70 mph
 US-54 from the south end of the Mexico bypass to the Route W interchange just across the Missouri River from Jefferson City, with the exception of the I-70 interchange area at Kingdom City, which is 45 mph. US-54 also has a 70 mph speed limit from Fall Hill Road in Cole County to just north of the Business Route 54 intersection in Lake Ozark.
 US-63 from the south end of the Kirksville bypass to US-54 north of Jefferson City, with the exception of the section through Columbia from Route B to Route AC, which is 65 mph.
 MO-7 from I-49 to just west of Clinton.
 The James River Freeway from I-44 to Route 13 west of Springfield is 70 mph. The speed limit drops to 60 mph through Springfield itself, as do other Missouri freeways.
 The US-71 expressway from Pineville to Harrisonville had a 70 mph limit before it was upgraded to I-49.

Most Missouri lettered highways are 55 mph, and in densely populated areas they can be less. There are several that have a speed limit of 60 mph, including the following:
 Route M in Jefferson County is an expressway for most of its length, and most of the highway has a speed limit of 60 mph.
 Route A in Jefferson County, an upgraded two lane road with shoulders, has a 60 mph speed limit. Route A travels between Hillsboro and Festus.
Route B in Boone County is mostly an upgraded two lane road with shoulders. As such, it has a 60 mph speed limit from just north of Columbia to the end of the upgraded section 1 mile south of Hallsville.
Route C in Cole County is an upgraded two-lane highway with shoulders, and has a 60 mph speed limit from just west of Jefferson City to just east of Russellville.
Route A in Osage County follows the former routing of US Route 50 from its intersection with modern-day US 50 to Loose Creek. Since the roadway is designed to the same standards as a major highway, the speed limit is 60 mph on that stretch of road.

In the urban areas of: St. Louis, Kansas City, Columbia, St. Joseph, and Springfield, the speed limit typically drops to 60 mph on Interstates and freeways. In addition, on I-44 in Rolla the speed limit is reduced to 60 mph from just west of Exit 184 to Exit 186 because of a substandard design.

Freeway speed limits in urban areas can be as low as 45 or 50 mph in a few very short sections in downtown Kansas City and St. Louis, or as high as 65 mph in the outer portions of the St. Louis, Kansas City and St. Joseph areas. The Cape Girardeau and Joplin areas have no reduced freeway speed limits, and I-435 around Kansas City has a 70 mph limit from I-35 in Claycomo to the Kansas State Line around the northern and western part of the metro area.

I-29 in Kansas City has a limit of 70 mph north of Barry Road in Platte County to south of Highway 169 in Buchanan County where the limit drops to 65 mph. North of Frederick Road in Buchanan County the limit returns to 70 mph until the Iowa state line.

Montana
On May 5, 2015, a bill to increase Montana's rural interstate highway speed limit from 75 to 80 mph was signed into law by Governor Steve Bullock.

Reasonable and prudent

In the years before the 1974 national 55 mph limit, and for three years after the 1995 repeal of the increased 65 mph limit, Montana had a non-numeric "reasonable and prudent" speed limit during the daytime on most rural roads. Montana Code Annotated (MCA) Section 61-8-303 said "A person ... shall drive the vehicle ... at a rate of speed no greater than is reasonable and proper under the conditions existing at the point of operation ... so as not to unduly or unreasonably endanger the life, limb, property, or other rights of a person entitled to the use of the street or highway."

The phrase "reasonable and prudent" is found in the language of most state speed laws. This allows prosecution under non-ideal conditions such as rain or snow when the speed limit would be imprudently fast.

No speed limit
Although the officer gave no opinion as to what would have been a reasonable speed, the driver was convicted. The driver appealed to the Montana Supreme Court. The Court reversed the conviction in case No. 97–486 on December 23, 1998; it held that a law requiring drivers to drive at a non-numerical "reasonable and proper" speed "is so vague that it violates the Due Process Clause ... of the Montana Constitution".

 Montana's US, State, and even Secondary roads have speed limits posted 70 mph/night:65; truck:60/night:55.
Seven years later, a research study conducted by the Insurance Institute for Highway Safety, a long-time advocate of the federal National Maximum Speed Law, showed Montana's 75 mph speed limit on rural Interstates was well received by motorists; traffic speed measurements taken by IIHS showed 76 percent of cars in compliance with 75 mph on those roads. IIHS also found large trucks subject to Montana's unchanged 65 mph speed limit for large trucks on rural Interstates slowed down dramatically, from a mean speed of 70 mph in 1996 to 65 mph in 2006, with the 85th percentile large truck speed dropping 11 mph, from 79 mph in 1996 to 68 mph in 2006.

75 and 80 mph speed limits
Despite this reversal, Montana's then-governor, Marc Racicot, did not convene an emergency session of the legislature. Montana technically had no speed limit whatsoever until June 1999, after the Montana legislature met in regular session and enacted a new law.

Montana law still contains a section that says "a person shall operate a vehicle in a careful and prudent manner and at a reduced rate of speed no greater than is reasonable and prudent under the conditions existing at the point of operation, taking into account the amount and character of traffic, visibility, weather, and roadway conditions." However, this is a standard clause that appears in other state traffic codes and has the practical effect of requiring a speed lower than the speed limit where a lower speed is necessary to maintain a reasonable and prudent road manner.

Montana also has limited sections of night speed limits.

On May 10, 2019, Governor Steve Bullock signed HB 393 into law.

Nebraska
The maximum speed limit in Nebraska is 75 mph on rural Interstate highways. This speed limit only applies to Interstate 80 between Omaha and Lincoln, and west of Lincoln to the Wyoming state line, as well as the small section of Interstate 76 that enters the southwestern corner of the state from Colorado to join I-80. Freeways and expressways in urban areas are posted at 65 mph. The speed limit in rural areas of Nebraska is 65 mph unless otherwise posted, although rural divided highways and Super two highways are posted at 70 mph. The most recent change to Nebraska's speed limits was enacted on April 17, 2018, which resulted in all maximum speed limits in the state (except those for rural Interstate highways) being raised by five miles per hour.

Nevada
Mountainous sections and those laid through narrow valleys are usually .

Prior to the imposition of the  speed limit in late 1973, Nevada also had a "reasonable and proper" speed Limit (non-numeric) on most of its rural highways, both freeway and others. The speed limit on certain two-lane highways is 70 mph including US 95 to the Oregon border (where the speed limit is 65 mph for trucks) and on certain sections of US 6 and 50 in the Nevada desert. Speed limits are 15 to 25 mph in school zones and 25 to 30 mph in residential districts. In 2015, the Nevada State Legislature voted to increase the statewide maximum speed limit to 80 mph to take effect in October of that year. However, between October 2015 and March 2017, no 80 mph speed limits were posted in the state.

On March 13, 2017, the Nevada DOT installed 80 mph speed limit signs on the 130-mile stretch of I-80 between Fernley and Winnemucca, excluding the Lovelock (exits 106 and 107) area.

On February 21, 2018, the Nevada DOT increased the speed limit on I-80 to 80 mph between Oasis and West Wendover.

In December 2018, the Nevada DOT increased the speed limit on more sections of I-80 to 80 mph. The sections are from Winnemucca to Battle Mountain and from Elko to Wells.

New Hampshire

It can be found on Interstate 93 from mile marker 45 to the Vermont border (excluding the Franconia Notch Parkway). The minimum speed on Interstate Highways in New Hampshire is  where posted.

Provided that no hazard exists that requires lower speed, the speed of any vehicle not in excess of the limit is deemed to be prima facie lawful. School zones receive a  reduction in the limit 45 minutes before and after the beginning and end of a school day.

Interstate 393 in Concord has a  posted speed limit for its entire length, with the exception of  zones on the westbound portion closest to the city center and the end of the highway.

New Jersey
New Jersey's only statutory speed limits are 50 mph rural, 25 mph urban. Since the state is largely suburbanized, it ranges between 25 and 50 mph depending the jurisdiction of the road and whether the municipality is township, village, town, borough or city status.

The common limited access freeway speed limit is 65 mph. However, shorter length freeways such as US 202, Route 15, Route 90, and Route 33 remain at 55 mph. In all 65 mph speed zones, the fines for speeding and other moving violations are doubled. Signs informing drivers of this appear after most 65 mph signs. Urban freeway speed limits are generally 50 to 55 mph. However, some freeways in urban areas retain a 65 mph speed limit such as the main line of the New Jersey Turnpike up to Exit 13 (Interstate 278), I-80 from the Delaware Water Gap (Exit 4) to the Passaic River (Exit 53), I-295 in the Trenton area, and I-78 from the Delaware River to the Newark border (Exit 55). Only the New Jersey Turnpike system, including the Eastern and Western spurs, the Newark Extension (I-78), and the Pennsylvania Turnpike Extension (I-95) have variable speed limits on their entire respective lengths.

Four lane or greater state highways (often with a jersey divider or grass median) are generally posted at 50 to 55 mph (Such as Route 73 in southern Camden County, New Jersey, US 130 in industrial Pennsauken and Mercer County, US 30 in Atlantic County, and US 322 east of Williamstown). County four-lane highways and municipal maintained four-lane roads (with a jersey divider or grass median) are not posted above 50 mph.

Two-lane rural state highways and county maintained roads generally have 40 to 50 mph limits. The only two lane surface roads posted at 55 mph in New Jersey are County Route 539, Route 70, and Route 72 in the Pine Barrens of Ocean and Burlington Counties and Route 54 in Atlantic County. The Route 33 Freehold Bypass section where it is a super two freeway is also 55 mph.

Urban two lane roads in boroughs and cities are typically 25 mph or 35 mph. Residential streets at the municipal or county level are generally posted at 25 mph speed limits in boroughs and cities. However, they can be as high as 40 to 45 mph at the county level, less likely in municipal maintained roads. Generally, anything above 40 mph becomes uncommon. However, there are a handful of 45 mph residential stretches such as Terill Road in Scotch Plains and Woodbridge Avenue (CR 514) in Edison. All rural non posted roads have a speed limit of 50 mph, as per state law.

School zones through urban and suburban areas on two lane roadways normally have a speed limit of 25 mph when children are present. However, this limit can be as low as 20 mph and as high as 35 mph in some areas.

New Mexico
Speed limits for all classes of roads and areas are set by statute in New Mexico, meaning that any changes to the state's speed limits would require a bill to pass both chambers of the Legislature and be signed into law by the Governor (or overridden by the Legislature in the event of a Governor's veto). With the exception of wartime, New Mexico had no default numeric speed limit until the early 1950s. Prior to the national 55 mph limit in 1974, the speed limit on rural Interstates was 75 miles per hour during the day and 70 mph at night. Primary highways in open areas had daytime speed limits of 70 mph and nighttime ones of 60 mph. Secondary highways in open areas had daytime speed limits of 60 mph and nighttime ones of 50 mph. Before the end of federal speed controls, the maximum speed limit was 65 mph on Interstate routes and 55 mph elsewhere. In May 1996 legislation enacted by Governor Gary Johnson raised the absolute speed limit in New Mexico to 75 mph. Signs are posted on the vast majority of the mileage of Interstate routes to that effect. The default speed limit for any road where no speed limit is posted is 55 mph.

New Mexico has six major freeway facilities, which include three lengthy Interstate routes. Part of US-70 (as a divided highway) between Las Cruces and Alamogordo is one of only two sections of non-Interstate route as well as being the first road in New Mexico that's not a freeway to have the 75 mph limit; as of January 2019, US 285 between Roswell and Vaughn was raised to 75 mph as well. New Mexico, Nevada (US 95 south of US 93), and Texas are the only three states with 75 mph limits on roads that aren't freeways. There is no statutory requirement for reduced speeds on urban freeways so that, for example at Santa Fe and Las Vegas the speed limit remains 75 mph on I-25. New Mexico, Kansas, North Dakota, Colorado, and Texas are the only states to have a speed limit greater than 70 mph in urban highways. Nonetheless, there are 65 mph limits on freeways in more heavily urbanized areas such as Albuquerque and Las Cruces. Other reduced speed limits do exist, but the lowest speed limit under normal conditions on New Mexico's freeways is 55 mph, which can be found on two sections of Interstate 25: The first section being three miles from the Big I to Gibson Boulevard in Albuquerque, and the second being a short stretch near Raton Pass. These particular stretches of I-25 were originally built as relocations of US-85, whose design and construction predate the interstate highway era. As such, these stretches do not meet modern interstate highway standards, and have closely spaced interchanges, sharp curves, and/or limited sight distances.

By statute, other state maintained roads may have speed limits of up to 75 mph. Four-lane divided highways in open areas often have 65 mph limits, with some 70 mph limits, such as almost the entire length of US 550 from Bloomfield to Bernalillo, and a 23-mile stretch of US 70 west of Roswell.

Primary two-lane highways in open areas with parking shoulders often have 65 mph limits.

Most primary two-lane highways without parking shoulders in open and mixed rural areas still have a 55 mph limit, but some have 60 mph limits.

A 65 mph left lane minimum speed limit is sometimes indicated on 75 mph roads with steep grades, "slower traffic keep right" is also in effect. On one-way roadways state law reserves the left and center lanes of two or more lanes for passing. There are reduced advisory speed limits for some roads during poor weather. Speeding fines are doubled in construction zones and designated safety corridors, with signs often stating this. There are no longer night speed limits, nor are there any differential speed limits for heavy trucks.

There are two other statutory speed limits in New Mexico that are often altered, especially on urban arterials or even city or countywide: thirty miles per hour in a "business or residence district" and fifteen miles per hour near schools at certain times. For example, in Albuquerque the default speed limit is thirty miles per hour as per state law, but many streets have a different speed limit. Some school zones there have twenty miles per hour speed limits. The city of Santa Fe's default speed limit is twenty five miles per hour. Although there are no signs to make drivers aware of the altered limit, the limit is signed on most roads where it applies. Los Alamos County alters the urban default and absolute speed limits to twenty five miles per hour and 50 mph respectively, but posts signs at county lines.
 The speed limit on NM 502 between San Ildefonso Pueblo and Pojoaque Valley High School had a 65-mph speed limit. In November 2005, the stretch between NM-4 and Pojoaque became a safety corridor. In 2007, the speed limit on the San Ildefonso-Pojoaque stretch was lowered to 55 mph.
 On Highway 68, the speed limit is 60 mph on much of the four-lane stretch between Española and Velarde.
 Minimum 65 left lane signs are posted on I-40 west of Albuquerque, a night speed limit of 30 mph is posted on State Highway 7 west of White's City going into Carlsbad Caverns.
 Truck speed limit signs are rarely posted. One road has a posted limit of 45 mph/trucks:35 in Escondida, just north of Socorro, and US 82 east of Alamogordo has a posted limit of 55 mph/trucks:50 for approximately a two-mile stretch.
 As of December 24, 2009, US 54 still has a 55 mph speed limit north of Tularosa. Yet NM-9 and CR-A003 have a 65 mph speed limit east of Columbus to NM 136 near Santa Teresa. CR-A003 (Columbus-Santa Teresa Highway) is the only county road in New Mexico to exceed the statutory maximum 55 mph speed limit for county roads.
 Interstate 10 was 70 mph between the Texas-New Mexico state line and two miles south of I-25 in Las Cruces until October 2012, when it was raised to 75 mph. While it is 75 mph in the rest of New Mexico, the speed limit is 65 mph in Las Cruces, Deming, and Lordsburg. 
 I-25 was posted 70 mph in Sandoval County from the Bernalillo-Sandoval county line to US 550, but the limit was raised to 75 mph in May 2014.
 State Highway 30, a paved two-lane road with shoulders, has a 55 mph speed limit from NM 502 to the junction with the road for Santa Clara Pueblo, then reduces to 45 mph and then to 40 mph upon entering the Española city limits. Prior to 2008 the speed limits were 60 mph from NM 502 until the junction with the road for Santa Clara Pueblo where it reduced to 45 mph, raised back to 60 mph until the Española city limits where it reduced to 50 mph, and then to 40 mph near its northern terminus at US 84/285.
 US 84/285 between Santa Fe and Pojoaque, before it was upgraded to a freeway, had a 45 mph limit from Guadalupe Road in Santa Fe to the interchange with NM 599, increased to 55 mph to the southern terminus of Santa Fe County Road 73, increased to 60 mph until entering Cuyamungue, decreased to 55 mph, and then to 45 mph upon entering Pojoaque. Since it was upgraded to a full freeway in 2005, the speed limit from Guadalupe Road to NM 599 is now 55 mph, increases to 65 mph until Pojoaque where it briefly reduces to 50 mph and then to 45 mph.
 The posted speed limit on Silver Avenue in Albuquerque is 18 mph. When the route was designated as a bicycle route in the late 2000s, Albuquerque officials established the unusual 18 mph speed limit on Silver Avenue to increase motorists' awareness of the street's designation as a city bicycle route.

Most of US 285 (non freeway) between Vaughn and Roswell is posted at 75 mph (as of December 2018.)

Outside of Bernalillo County, no points are assessed to one's license for speeding in rural areas in New Mexico, unless the excessive speed was a contributing factor to a traffic accident.

New York

Speed limits are statutory (set by law) or regulatory (enacted by regulation), not necessarily by engineering standards. New York has a blanket statutory "Reasonable and Prudent" speed law.

The default speed limit, posted as the "State Speed Limit", is 55 mph, which is in effect unless otherwise posted or in the absence of speed limit signs.

The New York State Department of Transportation sets speed limits in the vast majority of the state. Counties and most towns must petition DOT to change a speed limit. State law allows villages, cities, towns with more than 50,000 residents, and certain towns defined by law to be "suburban" to set speed limits on state, county, and local roads within their borders.

There is no state law regarding minimum speed limits, but a minimum speed limit of 40 mph has been set on the entire length of Interstate 787 and the entire length of Interstate 495 (the Long Island Expressway). The New York State Thruway does not have a firm minimum speed, but there are signs advising drivers to use their flashers when traveling at speeds below 40 mph.

New York does not have separate truck speed limits on its highways, except for the New England Thruway (Interstate 95), which has a limit of 50 mph for trucks and 55 mph for all other vehicles.

New York law allows area speed limits. An area speed limit applies to all highways within a specified area, except those specifically excluded. The area may be an entire municipality, or only a specific neighborhood. The defined area may also be the grounds of a school, hospital, or other institution. Area speed limits are signed at their perimeters with signs reading "Area Speed Limit" and the speed limit value shown below. "Area" may be replaced with a term that more precisely defines the area boundaries, such as "Town", "City", "Park", "Village" or "Campus".

Normally, the end of a lowered speed limit is marked with a sign reading "State Speed Limit 55", indicating that the statewide speed limit applies. In areas where a curve or other road condition makes the state speed limit inadvisable, a sign reading "End XX m.p.h. Limit" may be used, with XX replaced with the speed limit value. A "State Speed Limit 55" sign should be installed after the curve. This sign is sometimes misused in locations where the speed limit changes to a speed other than 55 mph. This is mainly applied on both undivided and divided rural non-freeway routes. Though rarely seen, some divided roadways are set as low as 45 mph but mainly stay at the state speed limit of 55 mph; in one exceptional case, that of the Scajaquada Expressway, the speed limit was lowered to 30 mph in 2016 after a fatality.

The top speed limit in most residential/urban and business district areas is at 30 mph, and state law prohibits speed limits below 25 mph on most common residential areas, though a speed limit of 25 is mainly only used in the New York City area and rarely seen outside of said area. However, School speed limits may be set as high as 30 mph to as low as 20 mph. New York City has established a number of 20 mph "Neighborhood Slow Zones" in residential neighborhoods. In residential neighborhood areas outside of New York City range between 30 and 40 mph and 35–45 mph on suburban/urban arterial routes.

New York's Criminal Procedure Law prevents law enforcement personnel from issuing a ticket for any offense that they did not witness personally, meaning that, among other ramifications, the state's electronic toll collection system can not be used for speed enforcement.

History
Many expressways and parkways in the New York City suburbs were posted as high as 65 mph in the early 1970s. During the 1973 Oil Embargo, New York lowered its speed limit to 50. The National Maximum Speed Law brought statewide speed limits up to 55. The city of New York, being a city, retained the 50 mph speed limit. New York restored its 65 mph speed limit in late 1995, soon before the NMSL was repealed.

Until September 2003, the state legislature needed to approve individual 65 mph zones, a lengthy process taking months or years of politically motivated debate. Then-Governor George Pataki signed legislation in September 2003 that enables NYSDOT and New York State Thruway Authority to raise speed limits to 65 mph on its roads that meet established design and safety standards. This legislation became active in March 2004, and the speed limit was subsequently raised to 65 mph on NY Route 7 (locally known as "Alternate Route 7"), Interstate 684 and Interstate 84 east of the Hudson River in New York.

North Carolina
Unless otherwise posted, the speed limit in North Carolina is:

  in rural areas
  within city limits

The highest maximum speed limit allowed in NC is  if determined to be "safe and reasonable" by NCDOT engineering studies.

This generally applies to non-freeway primary and secondary roads throughout the state. Prior to the National Maximum Speed Law that went into effect nationwide, North Carolina used to have 60 mph speed limits on two-lane primary and secondary roads. Warning signs are posted in all cases where the speed limit drops on a road. In addition, a "reduce speed ahead" sign is commonly posted on major highways, though it is being phased out.

It is rare that NCDOT will assign a speed drop greater than 20 mph. In Bertie County, the US 17 bypass in Windsor drops from 70 mph to 45 mph. In Moore County, Shady Lane Road outside of Carthage in the Hillcrest community drops from 55 mph to 30 mph. In Ocracoke, the speed limit on NC 12 southbound drops from 55 mph to 20 mph.

Although not statutory, it is relatively common to encounter  speed limits. Many suburban 2- and 4-lane roads, as well as most 4-lane roads within municipal limits, carry a 45 mph speed limit. 45 mph speed limits are also not uncommon in more densely populated rural areas. Subdivision and residential streets generally, though not always carry a  speed limit. However, when signs are not present, the speed limit is still 35 mph by default. In downtown areas, it's common to encounter 20 mph speed limits, although those are not statutory at the state level, and are typically controlled by the municipality the area is within. These speed limits are generally considered to be grandfathered in, per a policy from NCDOT stating new speed limits below 25 mph "will generally not be approved." There is one interstate posted at 50 mph, I-277 in downtown Charlotte. This is the lowest speed limit on any interstate in North Carolina.

School zone speed limits generally entail a 10 to 20 mph reduction below the original speed limit during times of day used for school arrivals and departures. Such a speed limit would be indicated when entering the school zone. Also, the default or modified speed limit is indicated after leaving the school zone. A school zone speed limit cannot be less than 20 mph.

Military bases are generally posted at a maximum of 50 mph. As of May 2010, Fort Bragg military two-lane roadways are now posted at 55 mph instead of 50 mph. Prior to May 2010, the speed limits higher than 50 mph through military bases were only on N.C. Highway 690 along the north side of Fort Bragg, Murchison Road (also known as N.C. Highway 210) and the All American Freeway (which is classified and numbered as a state-maintained Secondary Road even though it is a freeway).

The state park speed limit is 25 mph unless otherwise posted. These are not limited to places such as Hanging Rock State Park and Mount Mitchell State Park. The Blue Ridge Parkway is 45 mph. However, there are occasional 35 mph stretches. The National Park Service is responsible for highway maintenance and speed enforcement on the Parkway.

The county governments of North Carolina do not have any control over speed limits or any other aspect of road operation, as there are no county roads in the state. Municipalities, on the other hand, can set speed limits on city-controlled roadways, subject to applicable state laws. Freeways and expressways with no primary route number are part of the Secondary Road system and bear route numbers of 1000 or greater. Their maximum posted speed limit is 55 mph with four exceptions.

70 mph speed limits 
The following are the highways that currently hold a 70 mph speed limit:

 Interstate 40 from Old Fort to Morganton, from Statesville to Clemmons, and from Clayton to Wilmington
 Interstate 73/74 south of Asheboro to Ellerbe.
 Interstate 77 north of Statesville to the Virginia state line, and on the I-77 express lanes from the intersection with I-85 in Charlotte to Mooresville.
 Interstate 85 from Mile Marker 70 south of Salisbury to Mile Marker 130 east of Greensboro. and from Gorman (near Durham) to the Virginia state line.
 Interstate 95 from the SC state line to Exit 10 (Chicken Road), along the Fayetteville Bypass and north of Kenly to the Virginia state line.
 Interstate 140 for the entire length.
 Interstate 485 for the entire length.
 Interstate 540 for the entire length.
 Interstate 795 for the entire length, from Goldsboro to Wilson.
 Triangle Expressway (NC route 540) for the entire length.
 US Highway 1 from the southern end of the Sanford Bypass to NC 55 in Apex.
 US Highway 17 on the Elizabeth City, Edenton, Windsor, New Bern, and Pollocksville bypasses.
 US Highway 29 from Reidsville to the Virginia state line.
 US Highway 64 from Interstate 440 to Williamston (except on the Rocky Mount bypass) and from Plymouth to Columbia
 US Highway 70 on the Clayton bypass, Goldsboro bypass, and from Dover to New Bern
 US Highway 74 / Future Interstate 74 on the Rockingham-Hamlet Bypass, from Laurinburg to Orrum, from Evergreen to Whiteville, and a section from NC 108 east of I-26 in Polk County to mile 187 in Rutherford County.
 US Highway 264 from I 440 in Raleigh to Greenville, and on the Greenville northwest bypass. 
NC Highway 147 between NC Route 540 and I-40.
NC Highway 11 on the Greenville southwest bypass in Pitt County

65 mph speed limits 
A 65 mph speed limit can be found on these interstates:

 Interstate 95 from Kenly to Lumberton (exit 10) except on the Fayetteville bypass.
 Interstate 40 from Business 70 in Raleigh to Clemmons, except for short sections in Raleigh and Greensboro, and from Statesville to Morganton, and from Black Mountain to Asheville.
 Interstate 85 from Gorman to US 70 in Durham, From NC 147 in Durham to I-840 in Greensboro, from Salisbury to I-77 in Charlotte, and from Gastonia to the SC state line.
 Interstate 77 from Charlotte to Statesville,
 Interstate 26 from the SC state line to Hendersonville, and from Weaverville to the Tennessee state line
 Interstate 74 north of Asheboro
 Interstate 73 north of Asheboro
 Interstate 285 except in Winston-Salem

65 mph is posted on many short sections of non interstate freeway, especially in the central and western regions of the state. Long stretches of non interstate highway posted at 65 mph are only found on US 421 and US 52 in central NC.

60 mph speed limits
There are some interstate and US highway freeways with a  speed limit, generally in urban or mountainous regions.

 I-26 between Asheville and Hendersonville and north of Asheville to Weaverville;
 I-40 between Asheville and Waynesville and through Greensboro
 I-85 in Gaston (east of US 321 to the Mecklenburg County line) and Mecklenburg counties and through Durham
 I-440 along the northern half of Raleigh's Beltline
 US 1 Henderson Bypass
 US-23 Waynesville Bypass
 US 64 over the Virginia Dare Memorial Bridge between Manns Harbor and Manteo
 US 74 in Brunswick County from the Leland Industrial Park to NC 133
 US 301/Business 95 between Fayetteville and Eastover
 I 74 High Point

Only two Secondary Road freeways in the state have a 60 mph speed limit: Wade Avenue Extension, which is in Raleigh and unincorporated Wake County; and Aviation Parkway, in the segment running from south of Globe Road to Airport Boulevard, traversing parts of Cary and unincorporated Wake County.

60 mph speed limits along non-freeway segments are growing in popularity and have replaced 55 mph limits on several non freeway divided highways throughout the state. Most of divided highways with traffic lights are posted at 55 mph, but there are a few stretches posted at 60 mph, such as segments of US 17, NC 11, NC 148, and US 421.

US 17 north of Elizabeth City
NC 11 in Pitt county and Lenoir county
NC 148 in Lenoir county
US 1 in northeastern Moore County,
US 17 on the Shalotte bypass in Brunswick county
US 17 south of Washington
US 17 from south of Maysville to the Pollocksville bypass
US 74 from Lumberton to Evergreen
US 74 north of lake Waccamaw
US 74 east of Wadesboro
US 117 in Wayne County & Duplin County,
US 220 in Rockingham County only along bypass segments
US 264 from Greenville to Washington
 NC 11/US 13 north of Greenville
US 421 from Sanford to Siler City
US 421 along the four-lane arterial section in Pender County
US 158 from Winton to Murfeesboro
 NC 16 in Lincoln and Catawba counties (as of October 2012).
 US 64 between the Tennessee State Line and NC 60 in Cherokee County.

Previously, the entire US 220 alignment from NC 68 to the Virginia state line was 60 mph but went back to 55 mph between NC 68 and NC 704.

The only Secondary Road expressway in the state that has a 60 mph speed limit is the US 117 Connector in Sampson and Duplin Counties between US 117 and I-40 (The designation in Sampson County leaving I-40 towards Duplin County is SR 1783/Connector Road)

Other speed limits 
The only roadway in North Carolina currently with a minimum speed limit is the I-77 Express Lanes, with a minimum of 45 mph. Generally there is no minimum on interstates to allow for slow moving farm equipment.

Highways do not generally have separate truck speed limits in North Carolina. There are a few exceptions however, such as I-40 from Old Fort to Black Mountain (35 mph) and from Hendersonville to the Tennessee state line (50 mph) These limits are in place due to dangerous mountain curves and grades.

North Carolina operates a Safe Driving Incentive Plan (SDIP), a program that leads to insurance surcharges for moving violations based on a point system. In general, for speeding violations less than 10 mph over the posted speed limit in a speed zone less than 55 mph, one point is assessed; two points are assessed for exceeding 10 mph over the limit or speeding in a zone with a speed limit of greater than 55 mph.

A driver's license will be suspended for traveling faster than 15 mph over the speed limit, provided the speed traveled is greater than 55 mph; suspensions can result for other speeding infractions, such as traveling faster than 75 mph in a 65 mph or less zone or faster than 80 mph in a 70 mph zone. North Carolina law makes exceeding 80 mph anywhere in the state (regardless of the posted speed limit) a Class 3 Misdemeanor, as well as exceeding 15 mph over the posted speed limit.

The bill would have given the DOT permission to raise the speed limit on freeways deemed safe for 75 mph travel. However, the House defeated the bill, and no efforts have been made to raise them since.

North Dakota
North Dakota's major interstates, I-29 and I-94, have a 75 mph speed limit in most rural areas, with 55-75 mph zones within portions of the Fargo and Bismarck/Mandan urban areas (I-29 in Grand Forks is signed at 75 mph). The state's 4 lane Divided Highways as well as 2 short stretches of undivided 4 lane highways (US 2 around Rugby and U.S. 83 as it passes the eastern Lake Sakakawea Reservoir) usually carry a 70 mph limit, with 2 lane restricted to up to a 65 mph limit, and gravel roads have up to 55 mph limits. Roads within cities hold their own defined limits with 25 mph speed limits common in residential streets and 25-40 mph limits on urban 4-6 lane divided and undivided streets, with school zones at 15–25 mph.

Northern Mariana Islands

Ohio

Ohio is the only state east of the Mississippi River to allow 70 mph speed limits on non freeway roads. Both divided and non divided roads qualify.

These commonly are in the 50–60 mph range. On one case, however, the Ohio Turnpike has a  limit in the outer suburbs of Toledo, Akron, and Cleveland. Some urban areas are also posted with minimum speed limits, usually with a minimum of 40 or 45. At one time, portions of Interstate 76 and Interstate 77 in downtown Akron had a maximum speed limit of 50 mph and a minimum speed limit of 35 mph.

School zones in Ohio normally have a 20 mph speed limit, regardless of the road's normal speed limit, in effect during school hours.

Oklahoma
In Oklahoma, the maximum posted speed limit is 75–80 miles per hour on turnpikes and 70-75 mph on all other freeways. Most other rural highways, divided or undivided, have a 65 mph speed limit (although some rural divided highways and some sections of undivided US 412 have a 70 mph limit).  Rural sections of freeway or turnpike are supplemented with a sign warning "no tolerance". Also, rural four-lane turnpikes carry a minimum speed limit of is 60 mph. On May 9, 2016, Governor Fallin signed HB 3167 which removes numerical caps on rural highway speed limits in Oklahoma which took effect in November 2016. Even with this bill the speed limits across the state were not expected to change because of budget issues in doing studies  In April 2019, a new bill was signed into law that raised the limit to 80 mph on turnpikes and 75 on other freeways.

On July 28, 2020, the Oklahoma Turnpike Authority approved raising posted speed limits to 80 mph on 104 miles of turnpikes:
 Turner Turnpike from mile marker (MM) 203 to MM 216, between Bristow and Sapulpa, 13 miles
 Muskogee Turnpike from MM 2 to MM 33, between Muskogee and Tulsa, 31 miles
 Cherokee Turnpike from MM 3 to MM 28, 25 miles
 Indian Nation Turnpike from MM 93 to MM 104, between SH-9 and I-40, 11 miles
 H.E. Bailey Turnpike (Norman Spur) from MM 102 to MM 107, 5 miles
 Kickapoo Turnpike (partially opened) from MM 130 to MM 149, between I-40 and the Turner Turnpike, 19 miles

Existing speed limits on rural turnpikes like the Will Rogers Turnpike, main segment of the H.E. Bailey Turnpike, Cimarron Turnpike and Chickasaw Turnpike will not be changed as part of this action.

On August 3, 2020, the Oklahoma Transportation Commission approved increasing the speed limit from 70 to 75 mph on nearly 400 miles of I-35 and I-40.  The sections on I-35 are from the Texas border to the OK 74 overpass south of Purcell and from just north of the Oklahoma/Logan County line to the Kansas border.  On I-40, the speed limit will be increased from just west of Sallisaw to just east of Shawnee, from just west of Yukon to just east of Weatherford, from Clinton to just east of Elk City and from just west of the junction with OK 34 to the Texas border.

Oregon

The highest posted speed limit in Oregon is 70 mph on I-84 east of The Dalles, I-82 and US 95 (trucks 65 mph). Oregon state statutes allow for a maximum speed limit of 70 mph on rural interstate highways, and the law gives the Oregon Department of Transportation (ODOT) discretion to define which freeway segments to post the 70 mph speed limit. ODOT did not raise speed limits beyond 65 mph on other freeways, and strongly opposed legislative efforts to raise the maximum allowable speed limit. However, in July 2015, Governor Kate Brown signed a bill raising speed limits on several highways in eastern Oregon; the bill included provisions to raise the speed limit to 70 mph on I-84 and US 95. It was announced on October 6, 2017, that the truck speed limit will be increasing to 60 mph on rural interstate highways where the car speed limit is 65 mph as soon as new signs are posted. In all rural areas in Oregon, the speed limit is 55 unless otherwise posted.

Until 2002, Oregon state law required that all speed limit signs omit the word LIMIT from their display. The reasoning behind this was related to the explicit "basic speed" law that existed, which allowed citation for exceeding speeds "too fast for conditions" regardless of the posted speed. The typeface of the numerals on the signs varies greatly depending on which jurisdiction made the sign, due to its non-standardized design. In 2002, the Oregon Department of Transportation revised its supplement to the MUTCD, mandating the omission of the word LIMIT except on signs posted on Interstate highways and within city limits. As of 2014, ODOT has replaced nearly all SPEED signs posted on Interstates with SPEED LIMIT signs, but it was left to the various city governments to replace signs in their jurisdictions at their leisure, if at all. Thus, older SPEED signs are still a common sight across the state.

Attempts to raise speed limits
In 2003, the Oregon state legislature passed a bill that would have raised the maximum permissible speed limit on Interstate Highways to 70 mph for cars with a 5 mph differential for trucks, up from the previous 65 mph limit for cars with a 10 mph differential; this bill was signed into law by then newly elected Governor Ted Kulongoski on September 26, 2003. Although ODOT's 2004 study revealed that it is safe for cars to be traveling at 70 mph and trucks at 60 mph the Oregon Department of Transportation decided to not initially implement the increase out of concerns that it would not be safe to have trucks traveling at 65 mph. Prior to the National Maximum Speed Law, the speed limit on Oregon freeways was 75 mph with some 70 limits on two-lane roads in eastern portions of the state. On July 20, 2015, Governor Brown signed HB 3402 into law. This bill raises the speed limit on I-84 east of The Dalles, I-82 (HB 4047 signed 2/23/16) and US 95 to 70 mph for cars and 65 mph for trucks. It also increases speed limits on several other two lane rural highways to 65 mph for cars and 60 mph for trucks in Eastern Oregon. The law took effect on March 1, 2016.

School speed limits
In 2004, a law was passed revising Oregon's school speed limit laws. In school zones, on roads with speed limits of 30 mph or below, drivers were required to slow to 20 mph 24 hours a day, 365 days a year, regardless of whether or not children were present. This replaced most 'when children are present' placards. If the speed limit was 35 mph or higher, the school zone limit would be imposed either by flashing yellow lights or a placard denoting times and days of the week when the limit was in effect. The at-all-times rule was highly unpopular with motorists and was widely ignored. In 2006, the law was revised again, taking away the 'at all times' requirement and replacing it with a time-of-day system (usually school days, 7 a.m. to 5 pm). School crossings with flashing yellow lights remain. In many communities, school zones are strictly enforced and speed traps in these areas are commonly employed.

ODOT has not chosen a variation of speed between two-lane roads in Oregon, regardless of the terrain. Any rural two-lane road in the state has a default speed limit of 55 mph. Town speed limits are 20 mph in an alley, 20 mph in a school zone, 35 mph on boulevards, and 45 mph on roads with traffic lights.

Pennsylvania

The speed limit on urban freeways ranges from a low of 40 mph in downtown Pittsburgh and Philadelphia to a high of 70 mph on the Pennsylvania Turnpike around outer parts of Pittsburgh and Philadelphia.

In 1940, when the Pennsylvania Turnpike was opened between Irwin and Carlisle, the entire 160 mile limited-access toll road did not have a speed limit, similar to that of the German Autobahns. Prior to the 1974 federal speed limit law, all Interstates and the Turnpike had a  speed limit on rural stretches and a  speed limit in urban areas.

In 2005, with the change in the designation of "urban zones" in the state, the entire lengths of both the Pennsylvania Turnpike's east–west mainline and Northeast Extension were given  limits, except at the tunnels and through the winding  eastern approach to the Allegheny Mountain Tunnel.

The 70 mph speed limit was authorized by House Bill 1060, which was signed by Governor Tom Corbett on November 25, 2013. On July 18, 2014, the Pennsylvania Turnpike Commission announced the return of the 70 mph speed limit on a 97-mile stretch of the mainline from the Blue Mountain interchange (MP 201) to the Morgantown interchange (MP 298). Signs were erected on July 22, 2014. On July 23, 2014, PennDOT announced the speed limit will be increased to 70 mph on I-80 between interchange 101 in DuBois, Clearfield County and milepost 189 in Clinton County and on I-380 between interchange 8 (MP 10) near Mount Pocono, Monroe County and the junction with I-84 in Lackawanna County, on or around August 11, 2014, as a pilot project. The speed limit remains  within construction zones and tunnels, at mainline toll plazas, on the eastern approach of the Allegheny Mountain Tunnel, and between Bensalem and the Delaware River Bridge.

It is also only in effect on days that the school the road goes near is in session. Many schools have signs that blink when the school speed limit is in effect. There is no reduced school speed on divided highways, even if the school sits right beside the highway.

All state-owned two-lane roads in rural areas within Pennsylvania have a default speed limit of 55 mph unless otherwise posted.

The Pennsylvania Turnpike has a minimum speed limit of 15 mph below the posted maximum speed, though the minimum is only sporadically posted. This is not enforced for slow-moving trucks in areas with steep grades and signs are posted that instruct drivers to use their flashers if traveling below 50 mph (40 if the speed limit is 55). Pennsylvania has no default minimum speed limit on any other roads. However, minimum speed limits on certain highways may be enacted and posted as provided by Section 3364(c) of the Pennsylvania Motor Vehicle Code (Title 75 of the Pennsylvania Consolidated Statutes).

§3364(a) also requires, "Except when reduced speed is necessary for safe operation or in compliance with law, whenever any person drives a vehicle upon a roadway having width for not more than one lane of traffic in each direction at less than the maximum posted speed and at such a slow speed as to impede the normal and reasonable movement of traffic, the driver shall, at the first opportunity when and where it is reasonable and safe to do so and after giving appropriate signal, drive completely off the roadway and onto the berm or shoulder of the highway. The driver may return to the roadway after giving appropriate signal only when the movement can be made in safety and so as not to impede the normal and reasonable movement of traffic."

Drivers cannot be stopped by police for driving less than 6 mph over the posted speed limit (10 mph if the speed limit is less than 55 mph and non-radar timing devices are used, as use of radar devices is limited to "members of the Pennsylvania State Police" by §3368c2).

In October 2018, Governor Tom Wolf signed into law a bill authorizing the use of speed cameras in active construction zones on Interstate highways.

Puerto Rico
As effectively from the law, the following speed limits are:

  in urban areas.
  in rural areas.
  in freeways or expressways.
  in urban and rural school zones, when children are present.

Rhode Island
Along two-lane roadways, the default speed limit is  during the daytime outside a business or residential district. "Daytime" means a half-hour before sunset and a half-hour after sunrise. At night time and also uncommon on the East Coast, the default speed limit is  outside a business or residential district. Local governments are barred from raising the default speed limits during the day and at night. Rural Interstates are generally posted at  but  closer to Providence. Divided arterials and freeways other than Interstate are posted no higher than 55 mph. On April 12, 1996, speed limit of 65 mph allowed on rural interstates based on engineering studies. However, the only interstates raised to 65 mph are Interstate 95 from exits 1-9 and Interstate 295.

South Carolina

The urban area assignment of 60 mph usually includes the metropolitan area and the actual inner city area. The only exceptions to the rule are I-385 in Greenville, I-85 in Spartanburg, the SC 31 freeway around Myrtle Beach and I-95 around Florence. I-385 has a 55 mph speed limit at its terminus within the Greenville area. SC 31 is posted at  even though it is in the greater Myrtle Beach area. SC 31 was originally posted at 60 mph when it was built in 2004. I-95 even as a 6 lane semi-urban built freeway, maintains a 70 mph speed limit through the Florence area (as of June 2013, from just south of exit 160 to just south of exit 164, the speed limit has been reduced to 60 mph, a textbook speed trap). It is 6 lanes from SC 327 to I-20.

It is not uncommon that 55 mph can be expected in more built-up areas prior to municipalities and/or if the engineering on the highway is below standards.

Two-lane roads are 55 mph by default.

Speed limit drops generally are done in 10 mph increments but 20 mph drops are not uncommon. Improvements in the mid-2000s were done by SCDOT to warn motorists ahead of time for speed drops on various roadways. However, there are still some roadways that have not received that treatment. However, there are a couple roadways that get 25 mph to 30 mph drops as well.

South Dakota
Almost a decade after posting the 75 mph limit, average speeds on South Dakotan rural freeways remain at or below the speed limit. In the urban areas of Sioux Falls and Rapid City, a 65 mph speed limit is posted on Interstates 90 and 29. It was signed into law and took effect in April 2015. While the 80 mph speed limit was initially signed on all rural freeways in the state, the Interstate 90 stretch from Rapid City to the Wyoming Border returned to 75 mph due to safety concerns.

Tennessee

Tennessee statutes require rural interstates to be posted at exactly  unless a traffic study is performed indicating that such a speed is unsafe. The only auxiliary interstates in Tennessee with a 70 mph speed limit are Interstate 155, Interstate 269, and Interstate 840. 70 mph speed limits are required on other controlled access highways that are part of the State or Federal Highway Systems unless a traffic study indicates this speed is unsafe. Any other controlled access road in the state may be posted up to 70 mph, but this is not a legal requirement, and a study is not required to be performed before this is done. Examples of 70 mph limits are found on controlled-access portions of US 51 and SR 22, SR 111, SR 386, and SR 396. In 70 mph zones, the default minimum speed limit is 55. Urban interstates are generally posted at 55 to 65 mph, however, portions of Interstates 24, 40, and 65 and S.R. 386 in Nashville, as well as I-24 in Clarksville and Murfreesboro are posted at 70 mph.

Though a vast majority of undivided highways have, at most, posted 55 mph speed limits, Tennessee's statutory speed limits do not differentiate between divided and undivided highways, per TN Code § 55-8-152(a) (2018), so the statutory limit of  usually applies to undivided highways in the absence of signage or local ordinances to the contrary. Notable examples of 65 mph undivided highways are multiple stretches SR 22 surrounding the town of Dresden, where the road has two lanes in each direction (four lanes total), sometimes containing a central dual turn lane. U.S. Route 412 also contains a 60 mph four-lane undivided highway between Columbia and Hohenwald.

Speed limits set by municipalities could range from 15 to 55 mph, depending on the type of roadway. This is because the state of Tennessee grants strong home rule powers to municipalities and Dillon's Rule for unincorporated areas in the county for speed limit assignments on non-controlled access state-maintained roads, requiring that they fall within established constraints.

In the 2000s, the major cities of Memphis, Knoxville and Chattanooga petitioned TDOT to enact environmental speed limits in their respective counties after failing to meet EPA air quality standards, reducing speed limits from 70 mph to 65 mph and 55 mph for trucks. Knox County (Knoxville) also petitioned the state to enact these speed limits in all of the neighboring counties of the Knoxville Metropolitan Area, as well as Jefferson County. These moves were controversial, as people believed the actual purpose was to increase revenue from speeding tickets, and the Tennessee Highway Patrol (THP) reportedly started enforcing these as 70 mph zones in the Knoxville area after multiple truckers successfully won court cases and had their tickets dismissed. In 2018, these split speed limits on I-75 and I-40 in Roane and Loudon counties southwest of Knoxville were increased back to 70. On February 19, 2019, 70 mph speed limit signs were installed on I-40 and I-81 east of Knox County starting at exit 398, and in October 2019, the last of these split speed limits were increased to 70 mph on I-40 east of Knoxville and to 65 mph west of Knoxville with no separate restrictions for trucks. In Nashville, speed limits for freeways are posted at 55 mph at the center of the city, and 65 and 70 mph beyond, with no separate restrictions for trucks.  I-26 and I-81 in Kingsport, Bristol, and Johnson City continue with the staggered limits.

Prior to 1974, the maximum speed limit on Tennessee's Interstate highways was  day or night for cars and  day or night for trucks. Other rural highways had a maximum speed limit of 65 mph day and  night for divided highways and 55 mph for all other highways. Many of these other class roadways also had separate day and night speed limits as well.

Texas

Texas is the only state that does not prescribe a different speed limit for each road type in its state or federal highway system.

The law allows raising or lowering the statutory limit only if an engineering and traffic investigation indicates that a different limit is appropriate.

Truck speed limits

Texas once had separate, systemwide truck speed limits, but they were repealed in 1999 and 2011.

The truck speed limit used to be  day/ night when the regular limit was higher. This speed limit did not apply to buses or to trucks transporting United States Postal Service mail.

They reappeared with the introduction of  limits in 1987.

Effective September 1, 1999, Texas repealed truck speed limits on all roads except farm to market and ranch to market roads.

In 2001, a bill allowing 75 mph speed limit on roads in certain counties excluded trucks, introducing a 70 mph truck speed limit on roads with a higher limit. A bill in 2005 allowing 80 mph speed limits still excluded trucks. However, truck speed limits were fully repealed in 2011.

Night speed limits
Before September 1, 2011, Texas had a statutory  night speed limit on all roads with a higher daytime limit. In 2011, the Texas Legislature banned night speed limits effective September 1, 2011. However, as of June 2013, night speed limits (55) were retained on some county roads where the speed limit is 60 mph in Scurry County, just outside of Snyder, Texas.

Environmental speed limits

Texas is the first state to lower speed limits for air quality reasons, although the lowered limits may not meaningfully improve air quality.

In roughly a  radius of the Houston–Galveston and Dallas–Ft. Worth regions, the Texas Commission on Environmental Quality convinced the Texas Department of Transportation to reduce the speed limit on all roads with  speed limits by 5 mph. This was instituted as part of a plan to reduce smog-forming emissions in areas out of compliance with the federal Clean Air Act.

Initial studies found that lower speed limits could provide roughly 1.5% of the emissions reductions required for Clean Air Act compliance. However, follow-up studies found that the actual reduction is far less:
 The emissions modeling software initially used, MOBILE 5a, overestimated the emissions contribution of speed limit reductions. Rerunning the models with the next generation software, MOBILE 6, produced dramatically lower emissions reductions.
 Speed checks in the Dallas area performed 1 year after implementation of speed limit reductions show that actual speed reductions are only about 1.6 mph, a fraction of the anticipated 10% (5.5 mph) speed reduction.
With both of these facts combined, it is possible that the speed limit reductions only provide a thousandth of the total emissions reductions necessary for Clean Air Act compliance.

Facing immense opposition, poor compliance, and the finding that lowered speed limits produced only a fraction of the originally estimated emissions reductions, the TCEQ relented and reverted to the 5 mph reduction scheme.

Due to its enormous unpopularity, the Texas Commission on Environmental Quality examined alternatives to the 55 mph speed cap. Analysis suggested that the vast majority of emissions reductions were from reduced heavy truck emissions. A proposed alternative was to restore passenger vehicle limits but retain a 55 mph truck speed limit. Concerns about safety problems and enforceability of such a large differential (up to 15 mph on many roads) scuttled that proposal, and a compromise plan, described above, was enacted that retained uniform, but still reduced, speed limits.

In 2003, the Texas Legislature prospectively banned environmental speed limits, effective September 1, 2003. The wording of the bill allows environmental speed limits already in place to remain, but no new miles of roadway may be subjected to environmental speed limits.

Elimination of Dallas-Fort Worth region environmental speed limits
In 2009, the North Texas Tollway Authority raised the speed limit by 10 mph on two tollways. Several miles of these tollways had 60 mph environmental speed limits. These new 70 mph limits exceeded what is allowable under the environmental speed limit regime. NTTA was allowed to raise the speed limits by offsetting the higher limits' theoretical emissions increases with other transportation-related emissions reduction measures, including implementation of all-electronic tolling, which eliminated the need for some vehicles to stop at a toll booth.

In 2015, the Texas Department of Transportation cancelled all remaining environmental speed limits in the Dallas-Fort Worth region. Some speed limits were changed back to those in place before the environmental speed limits were enacted. On some roads the speed limit was not changed. On other roads, including some that never had environmental speed limits, speed limits were raised higher than they were before the environmental speed limits were enacted.

75 mph limits
Because Texas law allows  speed limits on any numbered state highway, city maintained road, or tollway, it is the only state with 75 mph limits on two-lane roads. Speed studies undertaken by TxDOT in response to legislation passed in 2011 took about 2 years, and the result is that the mileage of highway with a speed limit of 75 mph has increased from about 1,400 to about 19,000. 70 mph or lower speed limits have become unusual on rural Texas roads. Also, there are multiple urban Interstates and tollways in Texas where there is a 75 mph speed limit, such as I-20 in Odessa and Midland (prior to February 2016; it is now 65 mph on I-20 in Odessa-Midland), I-10 in the outer parts of San Antonio, and several managed toll lanes in the DFW area.

80 and 85 mph limits

Texas statutorily allows  speed limits on I-10 and I-20 in certain counties named in the statute, each of which has a low population density.

As of now, the roads with an 80 mph limit are:
 I-10 between mile 61.8 in Hudspeth County and mile 494 in Kerr County
 I-20 between mile 0 in Reeves County and mile 89 in Ward County.
 State Highway 45 South from the northern junction with US 183 to the southern junction with I-35 in Travis County. SH 45 North from the northern terminus of its concurrency with SH 130 to the northern junction with US 183 near the Travis/Williamson County border remains at 75 mph.
 State Highway 130 from I-35 north of Georgetown to the northern terminus of its concurrency with US-183 south of Austin.

As of now, the only road with an 85 mph speed limit is a  portion of Texas State Highway 130 from the northern terminus of its concurrency with US-183, southward to I-10 near Seguin().

US Virgin Islands

Utah

The maximum speed limit on Interstates is normally  in cities and, on most highways,  elsewhere. UDOT has now implemented HB83, raising the speed limit to 80 mph on an additional  of rural interstate, including I-80 from Nevada to mile marker 99, I-84 from Idaho to I-15, and I-15 between St. George, Utah and Mona, Utah.
 Although 80 mph is posted on most interstates, some stretches of I-80 and I-84 are posted at 70 mph east of Salt Lake City. I-80 is briefly posted 65 mph/truck speed: 55 between US 40 and Wanship. Speeds between Salt Lake City and Park City on I-80 are variable based on road conditions.
 The speed limit from Ogden to Spanish Fork on I-15 is 70 mph. From Mona south until Cedar City, excluding curvy sections and mountain passes, the speed limit is 80 miles per hour. Excluding a rural break in Iron and Washington counties, the speed limit on I-15 in the urban areas of Washington and St. George is 70 miles per hour until the southern border of Arizona. The speed limit on I-15 in Cedar City is 75 miles per hour.
 The Legacy Parkway, running between North Salt Lake and Farmington, originally had a speed limit of  along its entire length due to environmental concerns at the time of its construction.

80 mph speed limit
On April 3, 2013, Utah Department of Transportation spokesman John Gleason said "We’d only do it in a situation that would make sense: flat, straight roadways. The Utah Department of Transportation is looking at expanding zones where it can increase the speed limit from 75 to 80 miles per hour. The Utah State Legislature recently approved a bill allowing for a series of zones to become permanent, as well as expanding them in other places around the state. UDOT began a study on Monday (April 1, 2013) to place more zones on rural parts of I-15, I-80 and I-84. The areas under consideration, UDOT spokesman said, are on I-80 from Grantsville (exit 99) to Wendover, on the Utah-Nevada border; I-84 from Tremonton to the Utah-Idaho border; I-15 from Brigham City (North interchange) to the Utah-Idaho border; and I-15 from Santaquin to North Leeds." The speed limit on these sections has been increased from 80 mph as of September 17, 2013.

The change went into effect on July 1, 2014. By July 1, 2014, the state raised the speed limit on all rural interstates in Utah to 80 mph except I-80 from the Wyoming border to Salt Lake City, on I-84 from its junction with I-80 to Ogden and on twisty sections of Interstate 70 from its I-15 junction to the Colorado border (the speed limit on I-70 still varies between 60 mph and 80 mph depending on the topography of the section of freeway.). The speed limit on every other highway is 55 mph unless otherwise posted, although several two-lane, undivided roads have 65 mph speed limits, with divided sections of U.S. Route 40 and U.S. Route 189 posted at 65 mph as well.

By the end of 2016, UDOT raised speed limits to 80 mph on additional sections of I-15 and I-70.

Vermont
This is applied to rural two-lane roads. The minimum speed is defined at  only on Interstate highways. That includes where the limit is posted at 55 and 65 mph. However, as old signs are being replaced, the "40 MINIMUM" is being phased out, keeping only "SPEED LIMIT 65".

Virginia
A Virginia statute provides that the default speed limit "shall be 55 mph on interstate highways or other limited access highways with divided roadways, nonlimited access highways having four or more lanes, and all state primary highways." "The maximum speed limit on all other highways shall be 55 miles per hour if the vehicle is a passenger motor vehicle, bus, pickup or panel truck, or a motorcycle, but 45 mph on such highways if the vehicle is a truck, tractor truck, or combination of vehicles designed to transport property, or is a motor vehicle being used to tow a vehicle designed for self-propulsion, or a house trailer."

The same statute contains a number of exceptions, however, allowing higher speed limits "where indicated by lawfully placed signs, erected subsequent to a traffic engineering study and analysis of available and appropriate accident and law-enforcement data". (As of August 2015, Virginia has three such barrier-separated facilities: high-occupancy vehicle lanes on I-64 in the Tidewater area; as well as high-occupancy/toll "Express Lanes" on I-495 and I-95, and HOT/HOV lanes on I-395, all in Northern Virginia.) The statute also allows  speed limits on a number of specified non-limited access, multilane, divided highways.

The 70-mph provision was added to Section 46.2-870 via an amendment effective on July 1, 2010. The previous version of the statute had authorized a 70-mph speed limit only on I-85; the maximum limit permitted elsewhere was 65 mph. Notably, the revised statute does not require a 70-mph speed limit on any road nor make such limit automatic, due to the requirement for traffic and engineering studies. The Virginia Department of Transportation began studying Interstate highways with 65-mph speed limits during April 2010 to determine which roads should receive the 70-mph limit and announced that the studies would be conducted in three phases over a period of several months, with the initial phase focusing on 323 miles of highway with "no significant levels of crashes and congestion". As of July 1, 2010, VDOT increased the speed limit to 70 mph on a portion of one highway (I-295 south of I-64). On October 20, 2010, Governor Bob McDonnell announced that by the end of 2010, VDOT would post 70-mph speed limits on 680 miles of Virginia Interstates located outside of urban areas, representing 61 percent of Virginia's total 1,119 miles of Interstate highways. While the statute allows for speed limits up to 70 mph on urban Interstates, as of March 2015 VDOT has declined to post a limit higher than 65 mph on any urban highway other than I-295 in Richmond.

The statute also allows 70-mph speed limits on routes other than Interstates. Initially VDOT declined to consider any such routes for the higher limit, but in early 2012 VDOT posted a 70-mph limit on a portion of US-29 near Lynchburg.

Other Virginia statutes prescribe exceptions to the general rules set forth above. The notable aspect of Virginia's current speed limit laws is that the Department of Transportation has no authority to raise speed limits above the statutory limits unless the General Assembly passes a statute permitting the change. Since the National Maximum Speed Law was repealed in 1995, such statutory exceptions were largely confined to a highway-by-highway basis, as evidenced by the list of 60-mph exceptions in Va. Code § 46.2-870.

Notably, Virginia's reckless driving statute provides that driving 20 mph over the speed limit, or in excess of  regardless of the posted speed limit, is grounds for a reckless driving ticket. Thus, in a 70-mph zone traveling 16 mph (since July 2020) over the speed limit is prosecutable as a misdemeanor with penalties of up to a $2,500 fine and/or 1-year imprisonment.

Virginia law does not prescribe a fixed minimum speed limit, although a statute does authorize the posting of such limits where traffic and engineering studies indicate that they would be appropriate.

Virginia is the only state, along with the District of Columbia, that prohibits the use of radar detectors.

Wake Island

Washington
As of February 2016, the typical speed limit on a Washington freeway is  rural,  urban (the speed limits on these types of freeways only vary in the Tri Cities), with a truck speed limit no higher than 60 mph. The posted truck speed limit does not apply to any auto stage towing a trailer or trucks less than 10,000 pounds gross weight. Limits were raised to current speeds following the elimination of the federal 55 mph speed limit, to more closely reflect the common speeds of traffic at that time. There are a wide range of speed limits statewide, due to legislated flexibility for WSDOT in balancing the desire for transportation speed against safety considerations for any particular stretch of highway.

The speed limit for motorhomes and autos with trailers is 60 mph, the same limit as trucks. Roads with traffic lights are limited to 55 mph. The school zone speed limit is  but is in effect during certain hours or if children are present.

Some areas within Washington State use variable speed limits such as on portions of I-90 between Seattle and Issaquah and over Snoqualmie Pass.

West Virginia
Sections of I-64 and I-68 have lower truck speed limits because of steep grades; otherwise, West Virginia does not post separate truck speed limits. The West Virginia Turnpike between Chelyan and Mahan, and I-77 between Princeton and Bluefield has a 60 mph speed limit because of sharp curves.

Open country highways have a statutory limit of 55 mph, which includes most rural two-lane highways and even includes some one lane back country roads or any road without a posted speed limit. Speed limits are commonly reduced by 15 mph in work zones.

In 2019 the West Virginia Legislature passed a resolution allowing WVDOT to raise speed limits on interstates to 75 mph based on safety and traffic studies.

Wisconsin
The state of Wisconsin's speed limits are set out in statutory law but may often be modified by the maintaining government entity. In addition to a basic speed rule, Wisconsin law specifies certain occasions where reduced speeds are required includingand not limited to the approaches and traverses of rail crossings, winding roads, roads where people are present, and the crests of grades. Although there is no numeric minimum speed limit, state law prohibits the impediment of traffic by unreasonably slow speeds.

The state of Wisconsin has four default speed limits.  limits apply in school zones (on major roads during school arrival and dismissal periods only), near parks with children, and in alleys.  default speed limits apply, unless modified by the managing authority, on "service roads" within corporate limits. Within municipal boundaries and in areas of dense urban development a  limit is in effect unless another speed limit is indicated. In some rural jurisdictions, such as townships,  limit is the default speed limit for residential areas. The entry to such an area is to be marked by speed limit signs. Outside of built-up areas (these include denser business, industrial or residential land uses according to the relevant law) a  limit is effective in the absence of other indications.

While all 2 lane roads maintained by WisDOT as of 2015 have a  maximum, a small portion of Minnesota State Highway 23 that passes through the state south of Superior but is maintained by MNDOT has a  limit through the state.

Along with the aforementioned default speed limits, there are other statutory speed limits that more often require signs to be effective.  limits on freeways and  limits on expressways require signs to be effective. In the densest urban districts a statutory  limit is effective when adequate signage is used, as are  limits in areas of light development. The same applies to  limits on highways designated as "rustic" roads. However, "an alleged failure to post [such a speed limit sign] is not a defense to a prosecution" in the case of such statutory limits.

Wyoming

The bill passed the Senate on February 25 and raised the speed limit on certain freeway sections to 80 mph on July 1, 2014. On February 1, 2016, the speed limit on WY 120 (a two-lane highway) from the Chief Joseph Highway to the Montana border increased to 70 mph. Two other two-lane highway sections, WY 130 from Interstate 80 south to Saratoga and US 85 from east of I-25 to Newcastle, increased to 70 mph.

See also
 Driver License Compact
 Non-Resident Violator Compact
 Solomon curve
 Traffic violations reciprocity

Notes

References

Law review
 
 

Road transportation in the United States
United States
United States transportation law
